A Tale of Shadows is a 2017 Emirati thriller film directed and written by Tariq Al Kazim and produced by Yunjie Han. The film stars Chuka Ekweogwu, Rik Aby, Arzu Neuwirth, and Almer Agmyren in the lead roles. The film was released all over the United Arab Emirates, and most of the shooting was done on the outskirts of the country. The film followed by the sequel A Tale of Shadows: Illusions.

Cast 
 Chuka Ekweogwu as The Gardener
 Arzu Neuwirth as The Woman in White
 Rik Aby as Garet
 Almer Agmyren as The Watchman
 Dijana Divjak as Mary

Production 
The story revolves around a farm which on the outskirts of UAE. Few scene are shown in which the lead actor travels from Dubai to the UAE.

References 
 http://gulfnews.com/leisure/movies/features/emirati-horror-film-comes-out-of-the-shadows-1.2076911
 https://www.thenational.ae/arts-culture/film/new-emirati-horror-a-tale-of-shadows-lights-up-the-big-screen-1.619995
 http://english.alarabiya.net/en/life-style/entertainment/2017/08/17/Emirati-film-enters-the-Horror-movie-genre.html
 https://www.khaleejtimes.com/apps/pbcs.dll/dcce?Site=KT&Date=20170820&Category=LANGUAGE_ENGLISH&Module=4&Class=401&Type=LANGUAGE_ENGLISH&ID=132757
 https://www.facebook.com/khaleejtimes/videos/10154884351522864/
 https://www.imdb.com/title/tt6840928/?ref_=ttfc_fc_tt
 https://www.youtube.com/watch?v=ayy6oV1RbXk

2017 films
Emirati thriller films
English-language Emirati films
2010s English-language films